A deoxyadenosyl radical is a free radical that is structurally related to adenosine by removal of a 5′-hydroxy group from adenosine. This radical occurs in nature as a reactive intermediate. It is generated by radical SAM enzymes and by some varieties of vitamin B12.  The deoxyadenosyl radical abstracts hydrogen atoms from substrates, causing rearrangements and other post transcriptional modifications required for biosynthesis.

References

Enzymes
Free radicals